Line 9 (Línia 9 in Catalan) is a completely automated line of the Barcelona Metro network that is currently under construction, with 24 stations open in Barcelona and El Prat de Llobregat, L'Hospitalet de Llobregat, Badalona and Santa Coloma de Gramenet suburbs, since December 2009. The line is currently disconnected in two branches, with a connecting part between the two yet to be built. The Aeroport T1 – Zona Universitària section is called L9 South (L9 Sud in Catalan), and the La Sagrera – Can Zam portion L9 North (L9 Nord in Catalan). Upon completion, it will be the longest underground metro line in Europe.

Lines 9 and 10

The complete project encompasses an underground line with two branches spanning a large portion of the metropolitan area of Barcelona, crossing Barcelona, Santa Coloma de Gramenet, Badalona, l'Hospitalet de Llobregat and El Prat de Llobregat. Transports Metropolitans de Barcelona is the company operating the line.

The name line 9 (L9) can refer either to the whole project of L9/L10 or to the common trunk plus the L9 branches. The total system will have a length of 47.8 km, of which 43.71 underground and 4.09 on viaducts.

Line 9 shares its route with L10 for a large part. Its commercial speed is 37 km per hour.

Construction

Autoritat del Transport Metropolità approved the plan for metro and light rail lines in the Barcelona metropolitan area that included line 9 in 1999. The next year ATM began planning and design with construction starting in 2002.

Originally expected to be ready by 2008, ongoing problems with its construction delayed its expected completion until as late as 2013–2014. It was subsequently further delayed to 2016.

On 13 December 2009, the section between Can Peixauet and Can Zam, with the exception of Santa Rosa station, opened to the public. A further station, Bon Pastor, opened on 18 April 2010; as the first section of L10 was opened. The section from La Sagrera to Bon Pastor (except Sagrera | TAV station) opened on 26 June 2010.

On February 12, 2016 the El Prat branch opened from Aeroport T1 to Zona Universitària stations. This is a 20 km section with 15 stations, however three stations – Aeroport Terminal de Càrrega, La Ribera and Camp Nou – did not open, as they were built to serve future developments or for technical reasons.
 
Line 9 is being bored by a single  tunnel boring machine (TBM) – where other metros bore a pair of tunnels, one for each direction, Line 9's wider tunnel is broad enough to stack two lines of tracks and for the route's stations.

Because the route passes through different geological conditions, the TBM is designed to replace the cutterheads with heads suited for the current conditions.  In June 2010 the TBM's hard rock cutterhead was replaced with its original cutterhead, designed to bore through clay.

List of stations
(Stations under construction in italics)

El Prat area
Provisional L9S Start
 Aeroport T1 (Barcelona International Airport)
 Aeroport Terminal de Càrrega
 Aeroport T2 (Barcelona International Airport, RENFE)
 Mas Blau
 Parc Nou
 Cèntric
 El Prat Estació (L1, RENFE)
 La Ribera
 Les Moreres
 Mercabarna
 Parc Logístic
 Fira
 Europa | Fira (L8)
Central branch, shared with L10
 Can Tries | Gornal
 Torrassa (L1)
 Collblanc (L5)
 Camp Nou (T1, T2, T3 via Avinguda de Xile)
 Zona Universitària (L3) (T1, T2, T3)
Provisional L9S End
 Campus Nord
 Manuel Girona
 Prat de la Riba
 Sarrià (L6, L12)
 Mandri
 El Putxet (L7)
 Lesseps (L3)
 Muntanya
 Sanllehy
 Guinardó | Hospital de Sant Pau (L4)
 Plaça de Maragall
Provisional L9N Start
 La Sagrera (L1, L4, L5 RENFE)
 Sagrera | TAV (L4, RENFE-AVE)
 Onze de Setembre
 Bon Pastor
Besòs area
 Can Peixauet
 Santa Rosa
 Fondo (L1)
 Església Major
 Singuerlín
 Can Zam
Provisional L9N End

Extra cost 

Entering or exiting the metro line from the airport stations in Terminal 1 and Terminal 2 requires a valid ticket. A Single Ticket (Bitllet Senzill), a T-casual (formerly T-10), or a T-familiar are not considered valid, and will not allow exiting the line through these stations. An Airport Ticket at a charge of 5.15 euros can be purchased before exiting the metro. 
All time-based tickets with unlimited journeys (daily, monthly, quarterly or Hola BCN! tickets) are considered valid, and passengers travelling with them do not need to purchase any additional tickets to access these stations.

References

External links

9
Transport in Sant Andreu
Transport in Badalona
Transport in Santa Coloma de Gramenet
Standard gauge railways in Spain
Railway lines opened in 2009
Proposed rail infrastructure in Spain
2009 establishments in Spain
People movers